The Best of Nelly is a compilation album by rapper Nelly released in Japan on February 4, 2009.

Track listing
 Country Grammar (Hot Shit) - 4:47 :: Originally appears on Country Grammar (2000)
 Ride Wit Me (feat. City Spud) - 4:51 :: Originally appears on Country Grammar (2000)
 E.I. (Radio Edit) - 4:44 :: Originally appears on Country Grammar (2000)
 Hot In Herre - 3:48 :: Originally appears on Nellyville (2002)
 Air Force Ones (feat. St. Lunatics) - 5:03 :: Originally appears on Nellyville (2002)
 Dilemma (feat. Kelly Rowland) - 4:48 :: Originally appears on Nellyville (2002)
 #1 - 3:18 :: Originally appears on Nellyville (2002)
 My Place (feat. Jaheim) - 5:36 :: Originally appears on Suit (2004)
 Over and Over (feat. Tim McGraw) - 4:13 :: Originally appears on Suit (2004)
 Tilt Ya Head Back (feat. Christina Aguilera) - 4:13 :: Originally appears on Sweat (2004)
 Flap Your Wings - 4:09 :: Originally appears on Sweat (2004)
 Grillz (feat. Paul Wall) - 4:39
 Wadsyaname - 4:06
 Party People (feat. Fergie) - 4:02 :: Originally appears on Brass Knuckles (2008)
 Body On Me (feat. Akon & Ashanti) - 3:33 :: Originally appears on Brass Knuckles (2008)
 One & Only - 4:19 :: Originally appears on Brass Knuckles (2008)
 Dilemma (Jermaine Dupri Remix) (feat. Kelly Rowland & Ali) - 4:39
 One & Only (Remix) (feat. Double) - 4:20

Certifications

References

2009 greatest hits albums
Nelly albums